Kailash Patil is Indian professional football player who last played for I-League club ONGC FC.

Career
He scored 2 goals for ONGC F.C. against Hindustan Aeronautics Limited S.C. on 9 April 2011. He previously played for Air India FC. He Scored 2 more goals against Mohun Bagan AC on 24 April 2011, to give ONGC win.

He was playing local tournaments, when Rashtriya Chemicals and Fertilizers (RCF) coach Kishor Khedkar spotted him and brought him to Mumbai. He had a successful 2005 season with RCF. He was injured for most of 2006 and returned to RCF at the end of the next year with a slightly better salary. Success in the local Mumbai District Football Association's league got him the best player's award, and earned him Air India FC’s attention. He played for it for the first time in the 2009 season.

Career statistics

Club
Statistics accurate as of 11 May 2013

References

Living people
1987 births
People from Kolhapur
Footballers from Maharashtra
Air India FC players
ONGC FC players
I-League players
Indian footballers
Association football forwards